Harmothoe is a genus of marine Polychaete worms belonging to the family Polynoidae (scale worms). Species of Harmothoe are found world-wide to depths of at least 5,000 m but are more common in shallower water.

Description 
Body dorsoventrally flattened, short, with 15 pairs of elytra and up to 50 segments; the body is more or less covered by elytra, although long specimens may have a short posterior region uncovered.  The prostomium is rounded anteriorly and has distinct cephalic peaks on the dorsal surface.  There are three antennae, a pair of lateral antennae inserted ventrally, directly beneath the median antenna ceratophore. The neuropodia are elongate and tapering.  The notoochaetae are stout with transverse rows of spines and blunt tips. The neurochaetae also have transverse rows of spines and both unindentate and bidentate neurochaetae are present.

Biology 

Harmothoe is one of many genera in the family Polynoidae that contain bioluminescent species.

Taxonomic comments 

In many parts of the world, identification of species in this diverse genus is problematic, however recently published revisions provide a guides to species of Harmothoe from the Mediterranean,  Northeast Atlantic and from the Subantarctic and Antarctic.

Species
The genus Harmothoe includes 152 species as of June 2020

References

Polychaete genera
Phyllodocida
Bioluminescent annelids